Hana Mazi Jamnik (8 December 2002 – 11 August 2022) was a Slovenian cross-country skier. She participated at the 2020 Winter Youth Olympics in the cross-country skiing competition, participating in two events in the competition. She entered the girls' sprint event, but did not start.

sq:Hana Mazi Jamnik

Death
Jamnik died on 11 August 2022 after being hit by a truck in Strand, Norway.

References

External links 

2002 births
2022 deaths
Slovenian female cross-country skiers
Road incident deaths in Norway
Cross-country skiers at the 2020 Winter Youth Olympics
21st-century Slovenian women